The music of the Heroes television series was composed by Wendy Melvoin and Lisa Coleman of the duo, Wendy & Lisa. Some of the scores feature the voice of L. Shankar (credited as Shenkar). The score album and the soundtrack album were released via La-La Land Records. The soundtrack of the series contains some songs, including old ones.

Heroes: Original Soundtrack

Heroes: Original Soundtrack is the official Heroes soundtrack. It was released on March 18, 2008 by The NBC Universal Television, DVD, Music & Consumer Products Group. It contains recordings from the series' score by Wendy Melvoin and Lisa Coleman, including the show's theme music. The record also includes contributions from Panic! at the Disco, Wilco, Imogen Heap, Bob Dylan, Nada Surf and David Bowie, among other artist and bands. One of the contributions is "All Things Must Pass", the first new song in 10 years from The Jesus and Mary Chain. They released a re-recorded version of the song, under the title "All Things Pass", on their 2017 album Damage and Joy.

On February 29, 2008, NBC Universal Television, DVD, Music & Consumer Products Group released five music videos created by Heroes producer/director Allan Arkush, each combining show footage with songs from the soundtrack. The music videos were released on Zune and MSN.

Track listing

Absent from official soundtrack
The following tracks and pieces featured in the show are absent from the official soundtrack. Note that Season 3 and later were broadcast after the release of the official soundtrack.

Season 1
"Eyes" by Rogue Wave, which was featured in the first and fourth episode.
"Ooh La La" by Goldfrapp, which was featured in episode 20, "Five Years Gone".

Season 2
"Peter Piper" by Run DMC, featured in episode 1 of season 2, playing on West's car radio
"Boyz" by M.I.A., which was featured in episode 5 of season 2.
"We Interrupt This Programme" by Coburn, which was featured in the 8th episode of season 2.

Season 3
"Born to be Wild" by Steppenwolf, which was featured in episode 16 of season 3.
"Psycho Killer" by Talking Heads, also featured in episode 16 of season 3.
"The Chain" by Fleetwood Mac, which was featured in episode 18 of season 3.
"We Gotta Get out of This Place" by "The Animals", which was featured in episode 21 of season 3.
"Runaway" by Del Shannon, also featured in episode 21 of season 3.

Season 4
"Superstition" by Stevie Wonder, featured in episode 1 of season 4.
"An Honest Mistake" by The Bravery, also in episode 1.
"Grapevine Fires" by Death Cab for Cutie, featured in episode 2.
"Bad Body Double" by Imogen Heap, in episode 3.

Heroes: Original Score

Heroes: Original Score from the Television Series is a soundtrack album from the NBC TV series Heroes. It was released on April 14, 2009, via La-La Land Records, and contains the score written by Wendy Melvoin and Lisa Coleman (primarily music written for the first season), and features the voice of Shenkar. Heroes executive producer Allan Arkush contributes to the liner notes. The score album includes the four cues featured on the song album, "Heroes Title", "Fire and Regeneration", "Natural Selection" and "Homecoming"—the latter two are included in the suites for Mohinder and Claire, respectively.

Track listing

(*) Featuring the voice of Shenkar

References

Heroes (American TV series)
Television soundtracks
2008 soundtrack albums
2009 soundtrack albums
La-La Land Records soundtracks